Ala ol Din (also Romanized as A‘lā ol Dīn, A‘lā od Dīn, and ‘Alā' od Dīn; also known as Ālādīn) is a village in Sanjabad-e Jonubi Rural District, Firuz District, Kowsar County, Ardabil Province, Iran. At the 2006 census, its population was 186, in 31 families.

References 

Towns and villages in Kowsar County